Washington's 13th legislative district is one of forty-nine districts in Washington state for representation in the state legislature.

The district includes all or most of Lincoln, Grant, and Kittitas counties.

This rural district is represented by state senator Judy Warnick and state representatives Tom Dent (position 1) and Alex Ybarra (position 2), all Republicans.

See also
Washington Redistricting Commission
Washington State Legislature
Washington State Senate
Washington House of Representatives

References

External links
Washington State Redistricting Commission
Washington House of Representatives
Map of Legislative Districts

13